Deo A. Koenigs (born January 30, 1935) was an American politician in the state of Iowa.

Koenigs was born in Mitchell County, Iowa. He was a farmer. He served in the Iowa House of Representatives from 1983 to 1999, as a Democrat.

References

1935 births
People from Mitchell County, Iowa
Living people
Democratic Party members of the Iowa House of Representatives
Farmers from Iowa